Elections were held in the Australian state of Queensland between 1 March 1899 and 25 March 1899 to elect the members of the state's Legislative Assembly.

Key dates
Due to problems of distance and communications, it was not possible to hold the elections on a single day.

Results

|}

See also
 Members of the Queensland Legislative Assembly, 1899–1902

References

Elections in Queensland
1899 elections in Australia
March 1899 events
1890s in Queensland